Angaar is a 1992 Indian Hindi-language crime drama film directed by Shashilal K. Nair. The film stars Jackie Shroff, Dimple Kapadia in lead roles, along with Nana Patekar, Om Puri, Kader Khan, Kiran Kumar in supporting roles. The film was speculated to have been based on the life of Karim Lala.

Cast

 Jackie Shroff as Jaikishan "Jaggu"
 Dimple Kapadia as Mili 
 Nana Patekar as Majid Khan
 Om Puri as Parvez Hussain 
 Kader Khan as Jahangir Khan 
 Kiran Kumar as Anwar Khan
 Mazhar Khan as Farid Khan 
 Achyut Potdar as Jaggu's Father
 Sulbha Deshpande as Jaggu's Mother
 Neena Gupta as Majid's Wife
Firoz Irani as State Mental Asylum Doctor
 Anang Desai as State Mental Asylum Doctor
 Tom Alter as Public Prosecutor
 Chandrakant Gokhale as Defence Lawyer
 Virendra Saxena as Police Commissioner Sahni
 Ajit Vachani as Hirwani
 Lalit Mohan Tiwari as Psychiatrist
 Sudhir as Health Minister

Plot
Unemployed and branded a trouble-maker, Jaikishan lives a poor lifestyle in a slum-area called Asha Colony, very near Andher's Lokhandwala Complex, along with his sister, Seema; mom and dad. He comes to the rescue of a homeless orphan, Mili, who suffers from a deep inferiority complex, and permits her to live with his family. Brutally outspoken, he believes that India should be awarded unlimited gold medals for corruption at all levels, fully aware that these beliefs portray him as a "revolutionary", and prevent him from securing any gainful employment. His life will be turned upside down when he refuses to go along with the plans of the Khan family - consisting of builder, Majid; his goon brother, Farid, and their seemingly benevolent father, Jahangir. His family will also be traumatized after the Police arrest him for the alleged broad-daylight murder of Farid.

Reception
The film was the 9th highest-grossing film in India in 1992. The National Film Development Corporation of India described it as "an urban action film". The Times of India called it "one of the most engaging mafia films to have come out of Bollywood", attributed to it being "quite a dark film".
According to The Hindu, Angaar "was, in a way, a first of its kind, in that the film gave us within the mainstream cinema framework a fairly authoritative account of the alleged nexus between the underworld and the politicians who manipulated the law and order machinery to suit their nefarious activities." It further mentioned that the film had a "deep concern for contemporary life" which gave it a "distinctive touch".

Awards 
 Filmfare Best Villain Award - Nana Patekar
Filmfare Award for Best Dialogue - Kader Khan
 Filmfare Award for Best Art Direction - R. Verman shetty
 National Film Award for Best Special Effects - Shashilal K. Nair
 Bengal Film Journalists' Association Awards - Best Supporting Actor (Hindi) - Nana Patekar

Soundtrack

References

External links
 

1990s action films
1990s Hindi-language films
1992 crime drama films
1992 films
Films about organised crime in India
Films scored by Laxmikant–Pyarelal
Films that won the Best Special Effects National Film Award